Vinicius Santana da Silva (born 25 February 2001), known as Vinicius Popó, is a Brazilian footballer who plays as a Striker for Capivariano Futebol Clube.

Life and career
Born in São José do Rio Preto, Vinicius Popó joined Cruzeiro at 13 years-old in May 2014. In a few time, he established himself as prolific goal scorer playing for Cruzeiro's U17 and U20 teams. Due to his good performances, he soon started to be considered a promising player and, as a result, the club signed him a professional contract with a R$ 330 million termination fee. In January 2019, Popó scored five goals in seven matches for the Cruzeiro U20 at the Copa São Paulo de Futebol Júnior. Due to his performance at this championship, Cruzeiro's coach Mano Menezes promoted him to the senior team and listed him in the squad available to play the Copa Libertadores. On 10 March 2019 Popó made his professional debut when he came in the 75th minute of the match against Tombense, replacing Sassá. On 20 July 2019 Popó debuted in the Campeonato Brasileiro when he replaced Sassá at the 74th minute of the match against Bahia.

Titles

Cruzeiro
Campeonato Mineiro
Campeonato Mineiro Júnior

Goias
Campeonato Goiano Sub-20

References

External links
 

2001 births
Living people
People from São José do Rio Preto
Brazilian footballers
Association football forwards
Campeonato Brasileiro Série A players
Cruzeiro Esporte Clube players
Sport Club do Recife players
Goiás Esporte Clube players
Azuriz Futebol Clube players
Footballers from São Paulo (state)
Capivariano Futebol Clube players